Gerardo Guzmán Quirós  (October 18, 1874 – December 9, 1959) was a Costa Rican politician.

Personal data
Born in San Jose, Costa Rica, on October 18, 1874, he was the son of Don and Dona Victoria Jacinto Guzman Quirós Marin. He married Dona Celina Ulloa Flores.

Studies and public office
He began his public career as manager of the telegraph office messengers of San Jose and in 1894 was promoted to telegraph. He studied at the School of Law and graduated as a lawyer in 1903, the year he was appointed civil judge Heredia. From 1914 to 1917 he was judge of the First Civil Chamber and in 1917 returned to civil judgeship of Heredia. From 1920 to 1922 he was judge and president of the First Hall Civil 1934–1946 and judge of the Court of Cassation. From 1947 to 1948 he was judge of the National Electoral Court of Costa Rica, from 1948 to 1949 President of the Supreme Court of Costa Rica and the Court of Appeals from 1949 to 1953 and Minister of the Interior and related portfolios.

Death
He died in San Jose, Costa Rica, on December 9 of 1959.

1874 births
1959 deaths
People from San José, Costa Rica
Costa Rican politicians
Supreme Court of Justice of Costa Rica judges